William "Kid" Summers (1868 – October 16, 1895) was a Major League Baseball player. He played for the St. Louis Browns in 1893.

Sources

1868 births
1895 deaths
19th-century baseball players
Baseball players from Toronto
Canadian expatriate baseball players in the United States
Cedar Rapids Canaries players
Chattanooga Chatts players
Chattanooga Warriors players
Major League Baseball catchers
Major League Baseball outfielders
St. Louis Browns (NL) players
Major League Baseball players from Canada
Harrisburg Ponies players
Quincy Ravens players
Nashville Tigers players
Toledo White Stockings players
Mobile Bluebirds players